Oliver Milburn (born 25 February 1973), occasionally known by the name Oz Milburn, is an English actor and restaurateur.

Early life
Born in Dorset, Milburn was educated at the Dragon School in Oxford, and then Eton College.

Career
Milburn played Matthew Bannerman in Families and Liam in Green Wing. He has also been in Me Without You, The Bill, Backup, Tess of the D'Urbervilles, David Copperfield (as James Steerforth), Sweet Medicine, Byron, Born and Bred, The Forsyte Saga: To Let and Bodies. Milburn also joined the cast of Mistresses in 2009. In 2011, he played the role of Edgar Linton in the film adaptation of Emily Brontë's Wuthering Heights. In 2013, he lent his voice to the characters of Bartholomew Roberts and John in the video game Assassin's Creed IV: Black Flag.

Milburn was a regular on the first two series of The Royals playing the head of royal security.

Other ventures
As of 2020, Milburn was a restaurateur and co-owns the London restaurants Kitty Fisher's and Cora Pearl.

Personal life
Milburn is married to the BBC News Newsnight reporter and presenter Katie Razzall, daughter of Tim Razzall, Baron Razzall. They have a daughter and a son. The Milburns were honeymooning in Sri Lanka when the 2004 Boxing Day tsunami struck; Katie went on to file news reports on the events.

References

1973 births
Living people
English male soap opera actors
People educated at The Dragon School
People educated at Eton College
Razzall family